The 1979 season was APIA Leichhardt's first season in the National Soccer League. In addition to the domestic league, they also participated in the NSL Cup.

Squad

Results

National Soccer League

NSL Cup

Statistics

Appearances and goals
Players with no appearances not included in the list.

Clean sheets

References 

APIA Leichhardt FC
National Soccer League (Australia)